Ormond Beach is an industrial region of the city of Oxnard in Ventura County, Southern California. It's situated southeast of the neighboring community of Port Hueneme and extends southeast to Naval Air Station Point Mugu.

History 

Native Americans lived in the area and made use of the wetlands and lagoon, most notably the Chumash people, up until the early 1800s. Settlers from Europe began developing agricultural fields on the Oxnard plain in the 1840s as well as a commercial shipping wharf at Hueneme in 1874. Commercial and sport fishing began at Mugu Lagoon in the 1930s and after WWII, the area rapidly became more developed.

Recreation 

Ormond Beach is a surfing location. The average water temperature is about 55-59 degrees from December to May and 60-63 from June to November. Fishing in the area is permitted. Several species of fish can be caught including many types of perch, croakers, halibut, as well as other bottomfish such as banjo rays, shovel nose sharks, and skates.

Environmental issues 

The Ormond Beach area hosts over 200 migratory bird species and more shorebird species are known to use Ormond Beach than any other site in Ventura County. Among these 200 species, are two endangered species, in which protection and recovery are crucial to the survival of the species. The Western Snowy Plover and The California Least Tern are both native to the Pacific Coast, creating nesting sites up and down the coast of California and in to Mexico. Each year from spring to autumn, the dunes at Ormond Beach near Oxnard are encircled with bright orange mesh. The four foot tall temporary fencing creates a nursery for endangered California least terns and Western snowy plovers. October 2006 brought to a close the most successful nesting season at Ormond Beach in many years with 24 hatched plovers and 44 fledged least terns.

South Ormond Beach is a residue of a much larger wetland area. In 2003, the Western Alliance for Nature agreed to make the Ormond Beach Project a primary focus of work of the organization. On January 26, 2010, the Ventura County Democratic Central Committee passed a “Resolution to Preserve, Protect and Restore the Ormond Beach Wetlands of Oxnard California.” 

In 1999, the California Coastal Conservancy tried to buy approximately 660 acres of wetlands at Ormond Beach from Southern California Edison. After a couple years of negotiating, a setback came in the form of Occidental Petroleum, a different buyer who wanted to turn the site into a liquefied natural gas (LNG) terminal. The  price for the wetlands doubled and the deadline was approaching fast. By May 31, 2002, the last day the purchase is still available; citizens and leaders of Oxnard rallied, passed the decision, and effectively secured 265 acres of wetland. Simultaneously, another victory for Ormond Beach was won in preventing the LNG terminal from being constructed.  The California Coastal Conservancy plans to restore the historical wetland and increase the size of the protected area.

References 

Beaches of Ventura County, California